Majid Rahnema (1924 – 14 April 2015) was a diplomat and former Minister of Iran, born in Tehran. He represented Iran at the UN from 1957 to 1971. He worked on problems of poverty and production processes of poverty by the market economy.

Biography

Long an ambassador, he represented Iran at the UN for twelve successive sessions of 1957 to 1971. 
He was Commissioner of the United Nations in Rwanda and Burundi in 1959, for elections and the referendum that led these countries to independence. He also served on the University Council of the United Nations from 1974 to 1978, and also resident representative of the United Nations in Mali.

Between 1967 and 1971 he was Minister of Science and Higher Education in Iran under the Shah. In 1971, he created an Institute for Studies of Endogenous Development, inspired by the educational ideas of Paulo Freire, to begin a development project basis with the farmers of Lorestan.

After his retirement in 1985 he taught at the University of California at Berkeley for six years, then, from 1993, to Claremont Pitzer Colleges. He then settled in France, where he taught at the American University of Paris.

His many diplomatic activities in the third world led him to reflect on the development, particularly on poverty. He came to distinguish "poverty" (lifestyle based on moderation, which may be voluntary cf. Voluntary simplicity) from "misery" (lack of access to livelihood). The reflection of twenty years led to the publication of his book When Misery Hunts Poverty (2003). In this book, the author summarized his approach: 

'He is now trying to understand the many reasons and causes of scandal. It is this research that brings me now to show how a radical transformation of our lifestyle, including a reinvention of the chosen poverty, has now become the sine qua non of any serious struggle against new forms of production misery.'

A friend of Ivan Illich, he participated in his reflections on development. He died on 14 April 2015 in Lyon.

Works

 (fr) Apprendre à être, Fayard/Unesco 1972 
co-written with Edgar Faure etc.
 (en) Global poverty : a pauperizing myth, Majid Rahnema, Intercultural Institute of Montreal, 1991
 (fr) Le Nord perdu, repères pour l'après développement', Lausanne, éditions d'En-bas 1992 
co-written with Gilbert Rist and Gustavo Esteva.
 (en) The Post-Development Reader, compiled and introduced by Majid Rahnema with Victoria Bawtree, Zed Books 1997
 (fr) Quand la misère chasse la pauvreté, Fayard/Actes Sud 2003
 (with Jean Robert ) (fr) La puissance des pauvres, Actes Sud 2008
 Laissez les pauvres tranquilles, Les liens qui libèrent, 2012

See also
Postdevelopment theory

Notes and references

External links
 Conference on Poverty, encyclopedia of the Agora (Québec).
 Interview on poverty
 Interview La richesse est une menace pour les droits de l'homme 

20th-century Iranian diplomats
1924 births
2015 deaths
Exiles of the Iranian Revolution in France
Exiles of the Iranian Revolution in the United States
University of California, Berkeley faculty
Iranian expatriates in Mali